Wakonda or Waconda may refer to:

Fiction
Wakonda, Oregon, a fictional city in the U.S. state of Oregon from the novel Sometimes a Great Notion
Wakonda's Dream, a modern opera about contemporary Native Americans, often referred to as Wakonda

Places
Waconda, Oregon, an unincorporated community in Marion County, Oregon
Waconda Spring, a natural artesian spring in the U.S. state of Kansas
 Waconda Lake, a reservoir in Kansas, named for the inundated spring
Wakonda Beach State Airport in Waldport, Oregon
Wakonda, South Dakota, a town in the U.S. state of South Dakota
Wakonda State Park in the U.S. state of Missouri

Ships
USS Wakonda (YTB-528), a proposed United States Navy tugboat that was never built, the contract for her construction being cancelled in 1945

See also
Wakanda (disambiguation)